Anykščiai Regional Park covers  in northeastern Lithuania near the city of Anykščiai. It was founded in 1992 to preserve natural and cultural areas.

A horse museum, the Burbiškis estate, archeological sites that have been connected to King of Lithuania Mindaugas, and a narrow-gauge railway are located within the park. Its cultural landmarks include the home of the author Antanas Baranauskas.

References

 Regional parks of Lithuania official website. 
  Anykščiai Regional Park official website.

Regional parks of Lithuania
Tourist attractions in Utena County